Pope Michael II of Alexandria (Abba Khail II), was the 53rd Pope of Alexandria and Patriarch of the See of St. Mark.

References 

General

Atiya, Aziz S. The Coptic Encyclopedia. New York: Macmillan Publishing Co., 1991.

External links 
 The Official website of the Coptic Orthodox Pope of Alexandria and Patriarch of All Africa on the Holy See of Saint Mark the Apostle
 Coptic Documents in French

9th-century Coptic Orthodox popes of Alexandria